Head in the Clouds Festival is an annual music festival organized by 88rising. The lineups feature musical artists across the Asian diaspora.

Background
In 2015, Jaeson Ma and Sean Miyashiro founded 88rising as a music collective and management company geared towards representing artists from the Asian diaspora. Over two years, they began managing a small stable of Asian rappers focused on forming a hip hop collective. Their first performance took place in 2017 in Los Angeles with Rich Brian, Joji, and Keith Ape all performing live and the Higher Brothers streaming from Chengdu. The collective then embarked on a Double Happiness tour in February 2018, demonstrating the demand for Asian rap performances in the United States.

2018
On September 22, 2018, 88rising presented its inaugural Head In The Clouds Festival at the Los Angeles State Historic Park. The  lineup included acts based in North American and Asian music industries, including Rich Brian, Joji, Keith Ape, Niki, Higher Brothers, Dumbfoundead, and others. Japanese rapper Kohh made their debut United States performance.

Line-up
Anderson .Paak (special surprise guest)
Rich Brian
Joji
Murda Beatz
Keith Ape
Higher Brothers
Zion.T
Niki
Kohh
Laff Trax (Toro y Moi B2B Nosaj Thing)
Dumbfoundead
August 08
Yung Pinch
Sen Morimoto
Don Krez
Diablo

2019
On August 17, 2019, 88rising held their second annual Head in the Clouds music festival at Los Angeles State Historic Park. The lineup included the return of Rich Brian, Joji, Higher Brothers, Niki, and Dumbfoundead. The festival also included artists established in the South Korean music industry, including iKON, Jackson Wang,  and DPR Live. Local food festival organizer 626 Night Market coordinated food offerings.  Outlets began referring to the festival as the "Asian Coachella".

Line-up

88rising Stage
88rising
Joji
Rich Brian
iKon
Niki
DPR Live
Higher Brothers
August 08
Dumbfoundead
Deb Never
ICINC (Arta, Devinta Trista, Moneva & Cellosux)

Double Happiness Stage
K?d
Manilla Killa
Y2K
박혜진 Park Hye Jin
Josh Pan
Qrion
Don Krez

2020
88rising had planned for the 2020 Head in the Clouds festival to take place in the JIExpo Kemayoran of Jakarta, Indonesia in March 2020, with a lineup including DAY6 and Chung Ha as well as label members, Rich Brian, Niki, Joji, Higher Brothers, Stephanie Poetri, August08, and Dumbfoundead. It was eventually canceled due to the COVID-19 pandemic. In its place, 88rising held a free online concert called the "Asia Rising Forever Festival" to raise charitable funds for the purpose of combating the raise of anti-Asian sentiment.

2021
For 2021, 88rising announced they would return to hosting live audiences and would hold the festival over the weekend of November 6 and 7 at Brookside at the Rose Bowl. It would be organized by Goldenvoice, the promoters for Coachella. The lineup included Saweetie, CL, Japanese Breakfast, Beabadoobee, Umi, The Linda Lindas,  eaJ, keshi, Joji, BIBI, Niki, Seori, and Rich Brian.

Line-up

Saturday, November 6

88 Stage
Rich Brian
Illenium
CL
Saweetie
DPR Live + DPR Ian
Lil Cherry + Gold Buuda
Atarashii Gakko!

Double Happiness Stage
Japanese Breakfast
Umi
Stephanie Poetri
Elephante
Rei Ami
Audrey Nuna
Ylona Garcia

Sunday, November 7

88 Stage
Joji
Niki
EaJ
Keshi
Feel Ghood Music (Tiger JK, Yoon Mi-rae, Bizzy & Bibi)
Warren Hue
Luna Li

Double Happiness Stage
Beabadoobee
Guapdad 4000
Josh Pan
Seori
Wallice
The Linda Lindas
Mỹ Anh

2022
The 2022 festival was held at the Rose Bowl in Pasadena from August 20–21, 2022. International editions will also be held in Jakarta at the Community Park PIK 2 on December 3–4, and in Manila at the SMDC Concert Grounds on December 9–10, 2022.

Pasadena line-up

Saturday, August 20

88 Stage
 Keshi
Yebi Labs (Joji DJ set)
Jay Park
Kinjaz
Chungha
Dabin
Milli
Hojean

Double Happiness Stage
Mxmtoon
Yeek
Audrey Nuna + Deb Never
Thuy
boylife
Shotta Spence
1nonly
DJ Triple XL

Club Year of Dance Tent
Camgirl
Hu Dat
B

Sunday, August 21

88 Stage
Jackson Wang
Rich Brian
EaJ
Bibi
Warren Hue & Chasu
Atarashii Gakko!
Ylona Garcia

Double Happiness Stage
Teriyaki Boyz (Verbal, Ilmari, Ryo-Z & Wise)
Raveena
Lastlings
Dumbfoundead
Stephanie Poetri
No Rome
DJ Co 1

Club Year of Dance Tent
Venessa Michaels
JackJack

Jakarta line-up
Niki
Rich Brian
Joji
Jackson Wang
(G)I-dle
eaJ
Yoasobi
Bibi
Kaskade (special guest)
Atarashii Gakko!
Elephante
Milli
Spence Lee
Stephanie Poetri
Veegee
Voice of Baceprot
Warren Hue
Yanqi Zhang
Ylona Garcia

Manila line-up
Joji
Jackson Wang
Niki
Rich Brian
eaJ
Yoasobi
Zedd (special guest)
Adawa
Akini Jing
Atarashii Gakko!
Bibi
Elephante
Guapdad 4000
Jinxzhou
Manila Grey
Milli
Spence Lee
Stephanie Poetri
Warren Hue
Ylona Garcia
Zack Tabudlo

References

Music festivals in Los Angeles
Music festivals in Indonesia
Music festivals in the Philippines
2018 music festivals
2019 music festivals
2021 music festivals